The Palestinian Civil Defence (PCD) (Arabic: الدفاع المدني الفلسطيني) is one of the main branches of the Palestinian Security Services under direct responsibility of the Minister of the Interior. The organization is responsible for emergency services and rescue in areas under the control of the Palestinian Authority.

Establishment 
The Oslo Accords envisioned an Emergency Services and Rescue branch (Al Difa'a Al Madani) as part of one sole security force named "The Palestinian Police".

On 28 May 1998, then President Yasser Arafat issued "Civil Defence Law No. 3 of 1998", which brought into effect a draft law of the Palestinian Legislative Council. The organization came under the authority of the Interior Minister, under the direction of the Director-General of Civil Defence. Also a Higher Civil Defence Council, led by the Interior Minister, was established to formulate and implement the general policy of the Civil Defence.

Tasks 
The Civil Defence is an emergency and rescue organization which takes action in cases of natural catastrophes and emergency, including fire, rescue, external military attacks and other risks. The Civil Defence's target response time to emergency calls is 12 minutes.

Organization 
The Civil Defence operates out of 46 fire stations spread across the West Bank and Jerusalem. The fire stations are distributed throughout the governorates as follows:

Jericho Governorate

 Jericho

Tubas Governorate

 Tubas

Salfit Governorate

 Salfit
 Deir Istiya
 Biddiya

Qalqilya Governorate

 Qalqilya
 Hajjah
 Azzun

Nablus Governorate

 North Asira
 Burin
 Balata

Tulkarm Governorate

 Tulkarm
 Atil
 Anabta

Jerusalem Governorate

 Al-Ram
 Abu Dis
 Anata
 Bir Nabala
 Qatanna

Ramallah and Al-Bireh Governorate

 Beitunia
 Al-Bireh
 Birzeit
 Abwein
 Beit Liqia
 Al-Taybeh
 Nil'in

Hebron Governorate

 Yatta
 Dura
 Bani Naim
 as-Samu
 Al-Dhahiriya
 Al-Yasiriya
 Beit Ula
 Halhoul 

Jenin Governorate

 Jenin
 Siris
 Barta'a
 Al-Yamoun
 Ya'bad
 Qabatiya
 Arraba
 Marj Ibn Amir
 Jaba'

International support 
In June 2015, the European Union provided, as part of a €3.7 million grant, equipment to the Palestinian Civil Defence, including 5 rapid response vehicles and 9 additional vehicles. They were handed over to General Mahmoud Issa, the Director General of the Palestinian Civil Defence. Also provided were mobile lighting masts and electric generators.

In March 2016, the EU delivered 9 firefighting engines and three rescue trucks as part of a €20 million infrastructure programme in the Security Sector. They were handed over at the celebration of the conclusion of a capacity-building programme. Also 8 community police stations and a correctional facility in the West Bank were built as part of the infrastructure programme.

See also
 Palestinian Security Services
 Interior Minister of the Palestinian National Authority
 Palestinian Civil Police Force
 Palestinian National Security Forces
 Palestinian Preventive Security

References

External links
Official website (Arabic)

Civil defense
Palestinian Security Services
Emergency services in the State of Palestine